Fabrice-Jean "Fafà" Picault (born February 23, 1991) is an American professional soccer player who plays as a winger for Major League Soccer club Nashville SC.

Early life
Picault was born to Haitian immigrants in New York City.

Picault comes from a multigenerational soccer lineage. His grandfather played for the Haiti national team, while his father Leslie played professional indoor soccer with the Philadelphia Fever in the MISL.

He grew up in the Upper West Side, near Riverbank State Park along the Hudson River, where he played his first game.

At the age of nine, his parents moved with him to Miami for a change of life. When he was sixteen, he moved to Italy to begin his youth career, where he learned Italian and connected with the culture.

Club career
Picault started his career with the youth and reserve team of Italian club Cagliari, but later parted ways with the club after five years. He has commented on being subjected to frequent racism during his time in Sardinia.

Tampa Bay Rowdies
He later attended the NASL player combine in 2012 and impressed scouts working for Tampa Bay Rowdies, and later signed a one-year deal with the club. Picault is known for his quickness and pace combined with his vision and technical abilities.

Prior to starting his career with the Rowdies, Picault suffered a broken foot bone causing him to be sidelined through the preseason and first month and a half of the regular season. He made his professional debut in a 3–2 victory against Atlanta Silverbacks on May 19, 2012. Making 18 appearances in league play, Picault helped the Rowdies win Soccer Bowl 2012, but would register no goals.

After the end of the 2012 NASL Season, the Rowdies declined the contract option for Picault.

Fort Lauderdale Strikers
He returned for a second spell in the NASL with the Fort Lauderdale Strikers ahead of the 2014 season. He made his debut for the Strikers on April 12 in a 2–0 win over Ottawa Fury. He scored his first goal for Fort Lauderdale on April 26 to help the Strikers to a 3–2 win over Indy Eleven. Picault would experience a breakout season with the Strikers, hitting 12 goals in 24 appearances during the 2014 season, second best in the NASL that season. The Strikers reached Soccer Bowl 2014, but ultimately lost to the San Antonio Scorpions.

Sparta Prague
In January 2015, he moved to Czech team Sparta Prague. He was released by Prague on June 17, 2015. He never made a league appearance for the club, but came on in the 84th minute in a Czech Cup match against Jablonec. During his stay with Sparta he played mostly with the U21 side.

FC St. Pauli
In September 2015, Picault signed a one-year contract with German 2. Bundesliga club FC St. Pauli with the option of a one-year extension. He made his debut for St. Pauli on September 14 in a 2–0 win over MSV Duisburg, picking up an assist in the game. On March 11, 2016, Picault scored his first goal for St. Pauli in a 4–3 loss to SC Paderborn. He scored twice on April 16 to give St. Pauli a 2–0 win over VfL Bochum. He ended his first season in Germany with four goals and one assist from 16 appearances as he helped St. Pauli finish 4th in the table.

In April 2016, his contract was extended until June 2018.

In the 2016–17 Season, Picault made six appearances with one assists in league play as well as two appearances in the DFB-Pokal before being sold in the winter.

Philadelphia Union

On February 2, 2017, Picault returned to the United States and signed with MLS side, Philadelphia Union. He made his MLS debut as a substitute in the Union's home opener against Toronto FC. In May, Picault scored his first goal for the Union in a dominant 4–0 performance against D.C. United. In Philadelphia's next game, Picault scored again in a 2–0 win over the Houston Dynamo. On October 22, in the final game of the regular season, he scored twice and had an assist as the Union defeated Orlando City 6–1, a performance that earned him a spot in the MLS Team of the Week. Picault ended the regular season with seven goals and three assists from 28 appearances, along with two appearances in U.S. Open Cup play. Despite a strong first season from Picault, the Union missed out on the playoffs after finishing 8th in the Eastern Conference.

Ahead of the 2018 season, Picault received a three-match suspension for offensive language exchanged with Pierre da Silva during a preseason, closed–door scrimmage with Orlando City. On April 7, he made his first appearance of the season in Philly's 4th game, picking up an assist in a 1–1 draw with the San Jose Earthquakes. After the game, Picault was named to the bench for the MLS Team of the Week. He scored his first goal of the season on June 2 in a 3–1 loss to Atlanta United. On September 19, Picault scored three minutes into stoppage time to give the Union a 1–0 win against the Seattle Sounders. He scored two goals and had one assist on October 6 to help the Union defeat Minnesota United 5–1, a performance that saw him named to the MLS Team of the Week. Picault ended the regular season with ten goals and five assists from 29 appearances, helping the Union qualify for playoffs. In Philadelphia's first game of the playoffs, Picault played the full game in a 3–1 loss to NYCFC. Picault also made four appearances and recorded one assist in Open Cup Play, helping the Union reach the final, where they lost 3–0 to the Houston Dynamo.

On May 1, 2019, Picault scored his first goal of the 2019 season in a 2–0 win over FC Cincinnati. During the regular season, Picault made 32 appearances, scored four goals, and recorded four assists as the Union finished 3rd in the Eastern Conference to qualify for the playoffs again. Facing off with the New York Red Bulls in Philly's opening game of the playoffs, Picault came off the bench and scored in the 78th minute to level the score at 3. He then got the assist on Marco Fabián goal in extra time as the Union won 4–3. In Philadelphia's next match, Picault got the start, but was unable to replicate his heroics as the Union lost 2–0 to Atlanta United.

FC Dallas
On November 26, 2019, Picault was traded to FC Dallas in exchange for $300,000 of 2020 General Allocation Money. He made his Dallas debut on February 29 in a 2–0 win over the Philadelphia Union. On August 29, Picault scored his first goal for Dallas in a 3–2 win against Minnesota United. Two days later he was named to the MLS Team of the Week. On October 31, Picault scored twice and picked up an assist to give Dallas a 3–0 win over the Houston Dynamo, a performance that saw him named to the Team of the Week for the second time of the season. In a shortened season due to the COVID-19 pandemic, Picault played in 18 of a possible 23 regular season games while scoring three goals and adding two assists. He helped Dallas finish 5th in the Western Conference and qualify for the playoffs. Picault started both of Dallas's playoff games as they reached the Conference Semifinals, where they lost 1–0 to the Seattle Sounders.

Houston Dynamo
On December 17, 2020, Picault was traded to the Houston Dynamo, Dallas's Texas Derby rivals, in exchange for $275,000 of General Allocation Money, plus a potential $50,000 GAM in additional performance incentives. He made his Dynamo debut on April 16, starting in a 2–1 win over the San Jose Earthquakes to open the season. On May 8, Picault scored his first goal for Houston in a 1–1 draw against his former club, FC Dallas. He scored two goals on September 11 in a 3–0 win against Austin FC. His performance against Austin saw him named to the MLS Team of the Week. Picault ended the season with 31 appearances, 11 goals, and five assists. He was named Dynamo MVP and Dynamo Players' Player of the Year. Despite a good season for Picault, it was a poor year for Houston, finishing last in the Western Conference and missing out on the playoffs.

Picault scored his first and second goals of the 2022 season on April 2, helping Houston to a 3–1 win against Inter Miami.  He was named to the Team of the Week following the match. He scored another brace on September 13 as the Dynamo beat the New England Revolution 3–1, once again being included in the Team of the Week.  Picault ended the regular season with 7 goals and 3 assists in 30 appearances as Houston finished 13th in the West, failing to qualify for the playoffs again.

Nashville SC
On November 9, 2022, Picault was traded to Nashville SC in exchange for $50,000 of 2023 General Allocation Money, $50,000 of 2024 GAM, and up to a conditional $150,000 in 2024 GAM.

International career
On September 9, 2014, Picault, along with Fort Lauderdale Strikers teammate James Marcelin, was called up to the Haiti national team to face Chile in an international friendly at Lockhart Stadium. He did not make an appearance.

Picault was called up to the United States senior team for a May 22, 2016 friendly against Puerto Rico and made his debut in second half of that game. He won his second cap on October 11, 2018 in a friendly against Colombia.

Personal life
Picault has maintained a connection with his Haitian roots and holds passports from both the United States and Haiti.

Picault is also very fond of Haitian cuisine and music; he especially enjoys cooked plantain and his friends and cousin are even part of a Haitian band. He speaks seven languages, five in which he is fluent in: English, Creole, French, Italian and Spanish, while speaking a little Portuguese, and German.

During his time in Italy, he maintained close relationships with players who now play in the Serie A and has an Italian agent.

Career statistics

Club

International

Honors 
Tampa Bay Rowdies
 NASL Soccer Bowl: 2012

Individual
 Dynamo Team MVP: 2021
 Dynamo Players' Player of the Year: 2021

References

External links
 US soccer profile
 

1991 births
Living people
Sportspeople from Manhattan
Soccer players from New York City
American soccer players
United States men's international soccer players
American sportspeople of Haitian descent
Tampa Bay Rowdies players
Fort Lauderdale Strikers players
AC Sparta Prague players
FC St. Pauli players
Philadelphia Union players
FC Dallas players
Houston Dynamo FC players
Nashville SC players
North American Soccer League players
2. Bundesliga players
Major League Soccer players
Soccer players from Florida
Expatriate footballers in the Czech Republic
Association football forwards
American expatriate sportspeople in the Czech Republic
American expatriate soccer players in Germany
American expatriate soccer players